Deh Miyan (also Romanized as Deh Miyan,  Deh Miyan, and Deh Miyan; also known as Deh Miyan and DehMiyan) is a village in Sahray-ye Bagh Rural District, Sahray-ye Bagh District, Larestan County, Fars Province, Iran. At the 2006 census, its population was 800, in 102 families.

References 

Populated places in Larestan County